Unthank is a hamlet in Angus, Scotland. It lies approximately half a mile north-west of Brechin on the B966 Brechin to Edzell road. It used to be a possession of the Barony of Spynie.

References

Villages in Angus, Scotland